Mafuja Khatun is an Indian politician who is the current Vice-president of  Bharatiya Janata Party of West Bengal since from 2019.

Khatun is the first Muslim woman fielded by the Bharatiya Janata Party for Lok Sabha.

Career
In the 2006 and 2001 state assembly elections, Mafuza Khatun won the Kumarganj assembly seat from CPI(M) by defeating her nearest rivals Ahmad Ali Sardar and Nani Gopal Roy, both of Trinamool Congress respectively.

In the 2019 Lok Sabha elections, she was the Bharatiya Janata Party nominated candidate for Jangipur.

References

External links
BJP WEST BENGAL
Facebook
Twitter

Bengali people
Living people
Bharatiya Janata Party politicians from West Bengal
West Bengal MLAs 2001–2006
West Bengal MLAs 2006–2011
Year of birth missing (living people)